The Dunbar-Carver Historic District in Brownsville, Tennessee is a  historic district which was listed on the National Register of Historic Places in 2015.

The district is a historic center for Brownsville's African American middle-class citizens.  It includes 23 contributing buildings and three non-contributing ones, mostly along E. Jefferson Street in Brownsville.

It was listed on the National Register consistent with guidelines established in a 2014 study of historic resources in Brownsville.

References

National Register of Historic Places in Tennessee
Haywood County, Tennessee